Margitesia is a monotypic moth genus of the family Erebidae described by Strand in 1935. Its only species, Margitesia bugaba, was first described by Herbert Druce in 1891. It is found in Panama.

References

Herminiinae
Monotypic moth genera